Eduardo Álvarez may refer to:

 Eduardo Álvarez (tennis) (born 1950), Venezuelan tennis player
 Eduardo Álvarez Aznar (born 1984), Spanish equestrian
 Eddy Alvarez (born 1990), American baseball infielder
 Eduardo Alvarez (Oz), fictional character